Bond locations may refer to:

List of James Bond film locations
List of James Bond novel locations